Alaguzovo (Alağuz) is a rural locality (a village) in Abzaevsky Selsoviet, Kiginsky District, Bashkortostan, Russia. The population was 554 as of 2010. There are 4 streets.

Geography 
Alaguzovo is located 8 km east of Verkhniye Kigi (the district's administrative centre) by road. Leuza is the nearest rural locality.

References 

Rural localities in Kiginsky District